Paleta frontón is a Peruvian sport that was born in the capital, Lima, in 1945. This sport has its roots in the "pelota vasca" brought by the Spanish settlers, and the domestic "pelota mano", called "handball" at that time due to English influence. The sport is similar to squash but is played on an open court.

A wooden, carbon fiber or glass fiber paddle and a black rubber ball are required to play paleta frontón. The paddle is made from Peruvian oak typically logged near water based townships.

The fronton court consists of a playing field and a concrete wall which is placed in front of the playing area. There are lines on the court limiting the play area and marking the reception zones, similar to tennis. The court is split into two sections horizontally with the section of the court closer to the wall called the service zone. The other section is further split vertically into two zones where players stand at the beginning of a point. The serve must bounce off the wall and land in the other zone.

The  is in charge of regulating the sport. The official rules, written in the "Reglamento Oficial", are provided to each player for free. The official judge of the match is called the "Wes". The FDPPF is also in charge of organizing two national championships, the regionals and the "Campeón de Campeones" (Champion of Champions tournament).

Paleta frontón premiered at the 2019 Pan American Games in Lima under the category of Basque pelota.

References

External links
 Federacion Deportiva Peruana de Paleta Frontón

Ball games
Racket sports
Sports originating in Peru
Sport in Peru